Kimbolton School is a British HMC co-educational private boarding and day school in the rural village of Kimbolton, Cambridgeshire, England.

There are 1000 students, aged 4 to 18. Boarding and flexi-boarding is available to a limited number of students from the age of 11. There are approximately 700 students in the Senior School, and 300 in the Preparatory School.

Since 1950, the school has occupied Kimbolton Castle (the former seat of the Dukes of Manchester) and its grounds.

History
The school is the successor to the village grammar school and although there are references to a school at Kimbolton as early as 1531, the generally accepted date for its foundation is 1600. It originally occupied buildings within the churchyard, but moved to new premises in Tilbrook Road in the late 19th century. In 1949 its named was changed from Kimbolton Grammar School to Kimbolton School, and the following year it bought Kimbolton Castle from the Duke of Manchester.

The Senior School is based in the grounds of the Castle, while the Preparatory School is based at the other end of the village and connected to the senior school by 'The Duchess Walk', a tree-lined avenue.

The school's Latin motto is: "Spes Durat Avorum" (Let the hope of our forefathers endure).

Former headmasters

The school has a tradition of long-serving headmasters. Some of its features are named after them:

 Mr. Anderson ~1617
John Rugby ~1635
William Rugby ~1641
Samuel Bird ~1653
Samuel Taylor ~1664
John Gardiner ~1681
Mr. Trott ~1686
Mr. Crankshaw ~1706
Matthew Gregory ~1716
William Wheeler ~1739
Dr. Owen ~1740
W. Carr ~1757
Mr. Boulton (Dates uncertain)
John Thompson 1778–1826
John Bligh 1827–42
James Taylor 1842–47
John Thornton 1847–54
Robert Watson 1854–65
William Ager 1865–77
Robert Kater Vinter 1877–84
Edward Ulyat 1884–91
Arthur Bibby 1891–1913
William Ingram, 1913–47 - after whom the 1st and 2nd form house 'Ingrams' is now named.
 Cyril Lewis, 1947–73 - who oversaw the movement of the school to the Castle, and after whom the school's theatre/assembly hall is named.
 David Donaldson, 1973–87 - after whom the original science block (since converted to house geography, textiles and food & nutrition) is named, he also first admitted girls to the school.
 Roger Peel, 1987–2002 - after whom the sports hall is named.
Jonathan Belbin, 2002–

Campus
Kimbolton School's campus is currently situated upon Kimbolton Castle grounds. This land is in conjunction with some other areas of land owned by the school prior to the purchase of the castle in 1950.

The school's total campus area comes to ~105 acres.

The Castle 
The Castle was bought by Henry Montagu, 1st Earl of Manchester, in 1615. His descendants owned the Castle for 335 years until it was sold in 1950.

Charles Edward Montagu, the 4th Earl, who was created 1st Duke of Manchester in 1719, had reconstruction works carried out between 1690 and 1720. Sir John Vanbrugh and his assistant Nicholas Hawksmoor redesigned the facades of the Castle in a classical style, but with battlements to evoke its history as a castle, the portico was later added by Alessandro Galilei. The Venetian painter Giovanni Antonio Pellegrini redecorated some of the reconstructed rooms in 1708. These rooms included the main staircase, now called the Pellegrini Staircase, and the chapel. Gilded furnishings in a Louis XIV-inspired style by French upholsterers working in London were also commissioned.

For a later Duke, Robert Adam produced plans for the Castle Gatehouse and other garden buildings, including an orangery. Only one of these buildings, the gatehouse, was constructed, in around 1764. Mews buildings were added to provide stables, and an avenue of giant sequoias was planted in the 19th century.

The Castle was used by the Royal Army Medical Corps during World War II, and the 10th Duke of Manchester sold the Castle to the school in 1950. The furnishings were scattered in sales and some have come to national collections. There is limited public opening during the school holidays and at weekends.

The Castle is mostly used for 6th form and Spanish teaching and also houses staff areas as well as the 6th form common-room.

Most teaching and other activities take place in other buildings, on the school grounds.

The Vanbrugh Library 
The Vanbrugh Library at the Senior School holds over 12,000 books and periodicals.

School structure
Kimbolton school is divided into sections according to academic year (or Form). Each pupil is sorted into a house before entry and their house will collect house points called stars and compete in events such as sports day, MFL day (cultural catwalk) and house singing and music competitions. Each sections of the school have different houses for the different age groups ; some of these sections make use of a culturally fitting House system:

Preparatory school 
There are 384 pupils (as of the 2021/2022 curricular year) in the Preparatory School (ages 4 to 11), in four houses named after the families that owned the castle: Fitzpiers, Montagu, Stafford and Wingfield. Preparatory school pupils can be identified by their solid purple blazers.

Senior school 
There are around 700 students in the senior school, aged 11 to 18. This includes the sixth form.

Ingrams 
A house originally for boarders, Ingrams, was merged with Dawsons in the 1980s. Ingrams was later revived as a separate house for all First Form and Second Form pupils (these pupils are now colloquially referred to as "Ingrams"). Ingrams compete in a separate House competition to the rest of the senior school. As opposed to between houses, the students compete between classes, they have many of the same events as the senior houses.

Middles 
In four Houses, named after the two founders and two previous teachers at the school: Balyes, Dawsons, Gibbards, and Owens. Until recently, all the boarders were in Dawsons House; they are now allocated to all four senior houses. Uniform differentiating the senior school from the rest of the school includes–most notably–black, purple and white striped blazers. Middles pupils are pupils in 3rd form - 5th form (the middles houses are still used in sixth form).

Sixth form 
Sixth Form students all wear solid-black suits. Upper Sixth formers are also permitted to choose their own coloured jumpers and–for male pupils–ties.

Boarding 
The boarding houses are situated on Kimbolton High Street. The boy's boarding house, 'Kimbolton House', is by the top of the High Street, while the girl's boarding house, 'White House', is at the bottom, opposite the church.

All of the boarders eat together in the Dining Hall, and attend Chapel services fortnightly.

Notable former pupils
 Louise Brealey, actor
 Charles C. W. Cooke, journalist and broadcaster
 Lieutenant Dennis Arthur Copperwheat George Cross recipient
 Christopher Curry, founder of Acorn Computers
 George Furbank, Northampton Saints and England rugby player
 William Giles, Colonial Manager of the South Australian Company (1840–1861)
 Peter Jones (staff), BBC Sport radio commentator and master at the school
 Jonathan Kydd (academic)
 Mark Lancaster, The Rt Hon Lord Lancaster of Kimbolton, Conservative Politician, former MP and Member of the House of Lords
 Rev. Ronald Lancaster MBE (staff 1963–88), an Anglican clergyman, was Chemistry master and School Chaplain, and founded Kimbolton Fireworks in 1964
 Raymond Lewin George Cross recipient
 Clive Mantle, actor
 Howard Payne (staff), Olympic and Commonwealth athlete. Commonwealth Gold Medalist (hammer) 1962, 1966, 1970.
 Henry Peacham, a writer, was an assistant master at the school in the early 17th century
 Alexandra Pollard, journalist and deputy culture editor of The Independent
 Ben Saxton, 2016 Olympic sailor
 Dr Simon Thurley, historian, archaeologist, curator, writer, broadcaster, museum director, heritage crusader, Chief Executive of English Heritage (2002-2015)
 Waldo Williams (staff) leading Welsh language poet and master at the school.
 Edward Maria Wingfield, English colonist of America and later Governor of the school
 Martin Yates Conductor
 Anthony Dawson - Noted Economist and patriarch of the infamous Dawson family
 John Whitworth (1921–2013), countertenor, organist, and professor at the Guildhall School of Music

Old Kimboltonians Association 
The Old Kimboltonians' Association (OKA) provides a network between former students of the school. This usually manifests social events, sports fixtures and annual reunions.

References

ISBI page for Kimbolton School
ISI report for Kimbolton School (2005 inspection)
DFES page

External links
Kimbolton School Site

Educational institutions established in the 1600s
1600 establishments in England
Private schools in Cambridgeshire
Member schools of the Headmasters' and Headmistresses' Conference
Boarding schools in Cambridgeshire
Grade I listed buildings in Cambridgeshire
School
Alessandro Galilei buildings